Li Jianping (born May 1960) is a former Chinese politician who spent most of his career in Hohhot, capital of Inner Mongolia. He was investigated by the Chinese Communist Party's internal control and anti-graft agency, the Central Commission for Discipline Inspection, in September 2018. Previously he served as secretary of the Party Working Committee of Hohhot Economic and Technological Development Zone. He embezzled and accepted bribes of more than 3 billion yuan ($469.3 million), becoming the "largest corrupt official" since the founding of the People's Republic of China in 1949. His case was classified as the "largest case so far in the history of corruption in Inner Mongolia".

Biography 
Li was born in Bazhou, Hebei, in May 1960. In August 1982, he joined the faculty of Inner Mongolia Electronic School. He joined the Chinese Communist Party (CCP) in January 1985. He was secretary of Youth League Committee of Inner Mongolia Electronics Industry Bureau in April 1985, and held that office until October 1988, when he was appointed deputy head of Inner Mongolia Brewery.

He got involved in politics in October 1990, when he became an official in Hohhot Economic System Reform Commission. He was made director of Hohhot Water Saving Office in March 1996, concurrently serving as director of Water Resources Administration and director of Water-affair Authority. In March 2011, he took office as secretary of the Party Working Committee of Hohhot Economic and Technological Development Zone.

Downfall
On 7 September 2018, Li Jianping was placed under investigation by the Central Commission for Discipline Inspection (CCDI), the party's internal disciplinary body, and the National Supervisory Commission, the highest anti-corruption agency of China.

Li's deputy Bai Haiquan was put under investigation in July 2014 and was sentenced to life imprisonment for corruption and taking bribes of more than 170 million yuan ($26.594 million). 

On 22 August 2019, Li Jianping was expelled from the party and removed from public office. According to the "Criminal Law of the People's Republic of China", he was transferred to the prosecution authorities for investigation, and the property involved in the case was transferred along with the case. As of 31 December 2021, the prosecution authorities have not laid charges against Li, and the trial has not yet been determined. 

On 27 September 2022, Li was sentenced to death by the Intermediate People's Court of Hinggan League. His amount involved in the case reached more than 3 billion yuan ($4.14 billion), which is much higher than the sum of the amount involved in the case of Lai Xiaomin (more than 1.7 billion yuan), the former chairman of Huarong, and Zhao Zhengyong (717 million yuan), the former secretary of Shaanxi.

Personal life 
Li's son Li Suchao was a senior executive and major shareholder of Inner Mongolia Dongsheng Real Estate Development Co., Ltd.. Li Suchao has fled overseas.

See also 
Zhang Zhongsheng, former vice mayor of Lüliang, was sentenced to death with a two-year reprieve for taking bribes worth 1.04 billion yuan ($160 million).

References

1960 births
Living people
People from Bazhou, Hebei
People's Republic of China politicians from Hebei
Chinese Communist Party politicians from Hebei